Cesa is a genus of butterflies in the family Lycaenidae erected by Selma Seven Çalışkan in 1997. It contains only one species, Cesa waggae, first described by Emily Sharpe in 1898. It is found in Somalia and Ethiopia.

References

Butterflies described in 1898
Aphnaeinae
Butterflies of Africa
Taxa named by Emily Mary Bowdler Sharpe